Chase Atlantic (occasionally stylized as CHASE ATLANTIC) is an Australian alternative R&B band and production trio from Cairns, Queensland, formed in 2014. The group consists of three members: Christian Anthony, Clinton Cave and Mitchel Cave. Chase Atlantic has released seven EPs and three albums.

Career

2011–2013: Before Chase Atlantic
Christian Anthony and Mitchel Cave were in a boy band called What About Tonight. They formed the band to audition for season 4 of The X Factor Australia, although they were eliminated in week two, coming in eleventh place.

Mitchel Cave's older brother, Clinton Cave, had a successful YouTube channel, Clinton Cave Music, where the brothers would release cover songs on a regular basis. In 2013, the three members performed together for the first time under the name K.I.D.S. (Kind Imaginations. Destructive Situations.) and released the original song "Addicted." They have since deleted all content from the channel.

2014–2015: Dalliance and Nostalgia
The trio first released music under the name Chase Atlantic when Clinton Cave recruited Mitchel and Christian to assist recording a university project. The band would get their name, Chase Atlantic from nowhere. According to Mitchel, the name Chase Atlantic means nothing, it was a combination of two words that the band members really liked, Chase and Atlantic, "We spend a couple of minutes trying to come up with a plausible and profound explanation for their band name. “[Chase Atlantic] literally means nothing,” says Cave. “It’s so hard to find band names, we just put two words we really liked together that can’t be associated with anything else.”. Chase Atlantic officially released the EP Dalliance on 26 May 2014. Their early sound was often described as Pop Rock and Pop Punk.

In February 2015, the band released their second EP, Nostalgia. Their song "Friends" was featured in several Tumblr edits. The song was certified Silver by the British Phonographic Industry (BPI) in 2022.

Later in 2015, the band caught the eye of Benji and Joel Madden, and they signed the group to their management company, MDDN, in early 2016.

2016–2018: EPs and debut studio album
In January 2016, Chase Atlantic released "Obsessive." In February 2016, they released their third EP, Paradise, and did extensive promo for it, including an Australian tour where they played the EP in full.

In January's 2017, Chase Atlantic released their fourth EP, Part One, to coincide with their signing with Warner Bros. Records. This was followed by Part Two in March 2017. In mid-2017, the band announced their first tour of the United States, opening for Sleeping with Sirens' Gossip: Up Close & Personal Tour. Chase Atlantic released Part Three in September 2017.

Their self-titled debut album, Chase Atlantic, was released in October 2017. Later in 2017, they went on their first headlining tour in the United States, where they played 16 shows across 11 states, followed by an Australian tour opening for Blackbear.

In 2018, the band continued touring the United States by opening for singer Lights and playing US and UK festivals, including Bonnaroo, Vans Warped Tour 2018, and Reading/Leeds Festival 2018.

They released standalone singles "Numb to the Feeling" and "Tidal Wave" in mid-2018. That summer, they also left Warner Brothers Records and went independent.

2019–present: Phases and Beauty in Death
The group spent January to April 2019 in Los Angeles, working on their second album. In April, they announced the Phases Tour: North America for the summer of 2019, in support of their second album, Phases, and set the release date for 28 June 2019. The album was preceded by three singles, "Her", "Stuckinmybrain", and "Love Is (Not) Easy", which were released on 10 May, 24 May, and 7 June 2019, respectively.

In 2020, they began work on their third studio album, Beauty in Death, which the band released on 5 March 2021. On May 2, 2022, the group announced the release of a deluxe edition of Beauty in Death.

Music style 
Chase Atlantic has a unique style of music, which, according to the band, is "conjured up dark alternative pop punctuated by rock and R&B." Throughout their four years of making music, their music style has changed from an alternative pop sound to a more alternative R&B sound. The music is a combination of R&B, rock, pop, and alternative and is influenced by many artists from those genres, including Tame Impala, the Weeknd, the 1975 and the Neighbourhood.

Band members

Members
 Mitchel Cave – lead vocalist, bass guitar, programming
Christian Anthony – rhythm guitar, lead vocals, programming
Clinton Cave – production, lead guitar, tenor saxophone, backing vocals, programming

Touring members
 Patrick Wilde – guitar and bass
 Jesse Boyle – drum and bass

Discography

Studio albums

Extended plays

Awards and nominations

American Australian Association

References

Australian alternative rock groups
Queensland musical groups
Musical groups established in 2014
2014 establishments in Australia